Harold Cooke (29 May 1907 – April 1986) was a British fencer.

Fencing career
He competed in the team foil events at the 1948 and 1952 Summer Olympics.

He represented England and won a gold medal in the team foil at the 1958 British Empire and Commonwealth Games in Cardiff, Wales.

References

1907 births
1986 deaths
British male fencers
Olympic fencers of Great Britain
Fencers at the 1948 Summer Olympics
Fencers at the 1952 Summer Olympics
Commonwealth Games medallists in fencing
Commonwealth Games gold medallists for England
Fencers at the 1958 British Empire and Commonwealth Games
Medallists at the 1958 British Empire and Commonwealth Games